Garry P. Nolan (born c. 1961) is an American immunologist, academic, inventor, and business executive. He holds the Rachford and Carlota A. Harris Professor Endowed Chair in the Department of Pathology at Stanford University School of Medicine.

Education
Nolan graduated from Cornell University with a BS in biology with a specialization in genetics. He received his PhD in genetics from Stanford University under Leonard Herzenberg before doing post-doctoral work with David Baltimore at MIT, where he researched the development of rapid retroviral production system and the cloning of the NF-κB p65/ RelA DNA regulatory factor.

Research 
His areas of research include autoimmunity and inflammation, cancer and leukemia, hematopoiesis, and using computation for network and systems immunology. He is perhaps best known for his early work in the Baltimore lab at the Whitehead Institute, where he worked on developing rapid retroviral production for gene therapy. He also developed cloning of the RELA transcription factor, a key regulator in immune response genes and a principal cellular component that HIV uses to replicate itself. Nearly all gene therapy using retroviruses or lentiviruses is done using 293-based cell lines per that protocol. Other major projects he has worked on include phospho-flow signaling development (now licensed to Becton-Dickinson), FACS-gal (owned by Thermo Fisher), CyTOF multiparameter analysis, algorithmic approaches to analyzing complex single-cell datasets, proof that the NFAT transcription factor is both a REL protein and a key determinant in HIV replication, and develop of multiplexing technologies for tissue analysis, such as MIBI and CODEX, and the algorithmic approaches needed to understand them. As of 2022, his lab works on several FDA-supported projects for Ebola, influenza, Zika virus, and COVID-19, as well as continuing Nolan's immune-tumor interface in many human cancers.

Companies 
In 1996, Nolan founded the biotechnology company Rigel, Inc. with colleagues Donald Payan, James Gower, Thomas Raffin, and Ronald Garren in South San Francisco. In 2003, he established the biotech company Nodality, Inc., which develops "personalized tests for cancer and autoimmune diseases." Big data company BINA Technology was founded in 2010 and bought out by Roche in 2014 for $107 million. In 2011, he founded Apprise, which focused on cell analysis using split-pool technology. Nolan later sold Apprise to Roche, with whom he co-founded another startup, Scale Bio, which also focuses on split-pool technology. Along with three postdocs, Sean Bendall, Michael Angelo, and Harris Feinberg, Nolan founded Ionpath in 2014. This company is active in spatial proteomics. In 2015, with postdocs Yury Goltsev and Nikolay Samusik, he founded Akoya Biosciences, which commercializes Nolan's co-Detection by indexing (CODEX) technology.

Awards and honors 
Nolan has received numerous awards and fellowships and is one of the top twenty-five inventors at Stanford University. Among many awards and honors, the notable ones are given below:

 National Science Foundation Fellowship (1988)
 National Institutes of Health Fellowship (1990-1992)
 Leukemia Society Special Fellow (1992-1995)
 Leukemia Society Scholar Award (1995-2000)
 Hume Faculty Scholar (1993-1998)
 Burroughs Wellcome Fund New Investigator Award (1996)
 Leukemia & Lymphoma Society Stohlman Scholar (2000)
 Nature Publishing Group Outstanding Research Achievement Award (2011)
 United States Department of Defense Teal Innovator Award (2012)
 Cotlove Award by Academy of Clinical Laboratory Physicians and Scientists (2015)
 International Society for Laboratory Hematology Award (2021)
 University of Bern Hans Sigrist Prize (2021)

Bibliography

Research papers 
Nolan has authored more than 300 research papers. The most-cited ones are given below:
 Cloning of the p50 DNA binding subunit of NF-κB: homology to rel and dorsal (1990)
 DNA binding and IκB inhibition of the cloned p65 subunit of NF-κB, a rel-related polypeptide (1991)
 Production of high-titer helper-free retroviruses by transient transfection (1993)
 NF-AT components define a family of transcription factors targeted in T-cell activation (1994)
 Episomal vectors rapidly and stably produce high-titer recombinant retrovirus (1996)
 Single cell profiling of potentiated phospho-protein networks in cancer cells (2004)
 Causal protein-signaling networks derived from multiparameter single-cell data (2005)
 Computational solutions to large-scale data management and analysis (2010)
 Single-cell mass cytometry of differential immune and drug responses across a human hematopoietic continuum (2011)
 Extracting a cellular hierarchy from high-dimensional cytometry data with SPADE (2011)
 A deep profiler's guide to cytometry (2012)
 viSNE enables visualization of high dimensional single-cell data and reveals phenotypic heterogeneity of leukemia (2013)
 Multiplexed ion beam imaging of human breast tumors (2014)
 Data-driven phenotypic dissection of AML reveals progenitor-like cells that correlate with prognosis (2015)
 Mass cytometry: single cells, many features (2016)
 Science forum: the human cell atlas (2017)
 Deep Profiling of Mouse Splenic Architecture with CODEX Multiplexed Imaging (2018)
 Coordinated Cellular Neighborhoods Orchestrate Antitumoral Immunity at the Colorectal Cancer Invasive Front (2020)

Work in ufology and related fields 

In 2012, Nolan began analysis on the Atacama skeleton, a suspected alien corpse from Chile, which he later revealed to be a mummified human stillbirth with genetic bone defects and gene mutation causing deformity.

He was later approached by officials and an aerospace corporation to "help them understand the medical harm that had come to some individuals, related to supposed interactions with an anomalous craft." He was chosen primarily for the types of blood analysis his lab can perform. Initially via CyTOF blood analysis, he helped investigate the brains of around 100 patients, mostly "defense or governmental personnel or people working in the aerospace industry", of which a subset claimed to have seen unexplained aerial phenomena (UAP). The majority exhibited symptoms that were "basically identical to what's now called Havana syndrome" and had their brains scanned via MRI. Nolan stated that some of the brains were horribly damaged and that "what we thought was the damage across multiple individuals" turned out to be a "over-connection of neurons between the head of the caudate and the putamen" which he claims was disproportionate in this cohort compared to the general population.  Others have independently
verified the role of the caudate in intelligence and planning. This brain characteristic was something subjects were born with for multiple individuals in this subset.

Nolan is the lead author of the first study published in a peer-reviewed journal about anomalous materials associated with UFOs. The article reviews modern analytic procedures, including mass spectrometry, for characterization, analysis, and identification of unknown materials and how such have been applied thus far to study materials that, according to witnesses, dropped from hovering UFOs such as materials of the 1977 Council Bluffs incident. Since the formation of the Unidentified Aerial Phenomena Task Force in 2020, multiple publications have reported on Nolan's involvement with The Pentagon and the CIA investigating samples of materials supposedly ejected at purported sites of UFO sightings.

Nolan appeared on Fox News' Tucker Carlson Tonight show on August 1st 2022, during which he discussed his UAP related research in an hour long interview.

References 

Living people
Stanford University faculty
American pathologists
Ufologists
Year of birth missing (living people)
Cornell University